Kevin Cardozo (born 20 February 1998) is an Argentine professional footballer who plays as a midfielder for Club Atlético Fénix.

Career
Cardozo's senior career got underway with Lanús, having joined from Brown. He was promoted to their senior team during the 2017–18 Argentine Primera División season, initially appearing as an unused substitute for three fixtures between October 2017 and April 2018. On 28 April, Cardozo made his professional football bow during a goalless tie at home to Argentinos Juniors; he was subbed on for Gastón Lodico with sixteen minutes left. Three months later, in July, Primera B Nacional club Olimpo loaned Cardozo. However, he terminated his loan in the following August.

Career statistics
.

References

External links

1998 births
Living people
People from Almirante Brown Partido
Argentine footballers
Association football midfielders
Argentine Primera División players
Primera B Metropolitana players
Club Atlético Lanús footballers
Olimpo footballers
Club Atlético Fénix players
Sportspeople from Buenos Aires Province